Muir House may refer to:

in the United States (by state then city)
John Muir National Historic Site, Martinez, California, a National Historic Landmark and listed on the National Register of Historic Places (NRHP) in Contra Costa County
Muir House (Nicholasville, Kentucky), NRHP-listed in Jessamine County
Muir House (Shelbyville, Kentucky), NRHP-listed in Shelby County
David Muir House, Beaver, Utah, NRHP-listed in Beaver County
Muir House (Mendon, Utah), NRHP-listed in Cache County